Dame Jean Marjory Herbison  (29 April 1923 – 20 May 2007) was a New Zealand academic, educator, researcher and Chancellor of the University of Canterbury. She was the first woman to hold the post of chancellor at a New Zealand university.

Biography
Herbison was born in Dunedin in 1923, and attended Southland Girls' High School. She earned a BA from the University of Canterbury, a Diploma of Teaching from Auckland Teachers College, and an MA from the University of Northern Iowa. She was an Associate of the University of London Institute of Education. She has held a Fulbright Scholarship and an Imperial Relations Trust Fellowship.

She taught at Avonside Girls' High School from 1952 to 1959, and in 1960 became Dean of Christchurch Teachers' College. From 1968 to 1974 she was Vice-Principal of the Teachers College and in 1975 became associate director of Christchurch Polytechnic, a position she held until her retirement in 1984. She was elected to the Council of the University of Canterbury in 1970 and was Chancellor of the university from 1979 to 1984.

Herbison was a Fellow of the Commonwealth Council for Educational Administration and the New Zealand Educational Administration and Leadership Society. She was an Honorary Fellow of the New Zealand Educational Institute (NZEI) and the New Zealand Institute of Management.

Herbison lived in retirement in Christchurch before her death in 2007.

Honours and awards
In the 1976 Queen's Birthday Honours, Herbision was made a Companion of the Order of St Michael and St George, for services to education, and in 1977 she was awarded the Queen's Silver Jubilee Medal.

She was appointed a Dame Commander of the Order of the British Empire, for services to education, in the 1985 Queen's Birthday Honours. In 1987 she was awarded an Honorary Doctorate of Letters by the University of Canterbury.

Jean Herbison Lecture
Since 1990 the Jean Herbison Lecture at the New Zealand Association for Research in Education honours Herbison.

 2017 Leonie Pihama
 2016 Helen May
 2015 Joce Jesson
 2014	Graham Hingangaroa Smith
 2013	Martin Thrupp
 2012	Peter Roberts
 2011	Wally Penetito
 2010	Stuart McNaughton
 2009	Cathy Wylie
 2008	Joy Cullen
 2007	Keith Ballard
 2006	Geraldine McDonald
 2005	Noeline Alcorn
 2004	Alison Jones
 2003	Margaret Carr
 2001	Graham Nuthall
 2000	Margaret Maaka
 1999	William Tunmer
 1998	Linda Smith
 1997	Marie Clay
 1996	Arapera Royal Tangaere
 1995	Ivan Snook
 1994	Warwick Elley
 1993	Geraldine McDonald
 1992	Noeline Alcorn
 1991	Anne Smith
 1990	Anne Meade

References

External links
NZARE website/bio

1923 births
2007 deaths
New Zealand Companions of the Order of St Michael and St George
New Zealand Dames Commander of the Order of the British Empire
Academic staff of Te Pūkenga – New Zealand Institute of Skills and Technology
University of Canterbury alumni
Schoolteachers from Dunedin
People educated at Southland Girls' High School
Chancellors of the University of Canterbury
University of Auckland alumni
University of Northern Iowa alumni
New Zealand expatriates in the United States